Kanoite is a light pinkish brown silicate mineral that is found in metamorphic rocks. It is a member of pyroxene group and clinopyroxene subgroup.

Crystallography
Kanoite crystallizes in the monoclinic crystal system. Its Hermann–Mauguin Symbol is 2/m. Under this crystal system, the three axes of the crystal are all different in length. The a and the b axes are perpendicular, and b and c axes are perpendicular. The a and c axes make an oblique shape. The axial ratio for kanoite is a:b:c =1.0894:1:0.5884 and the cell dimensions are: a = 9.73, b = 8.93 and c = 5.26 Å with Z = 4. Kanoite has a 2-fold axis and a mirror plane.

Kanoite is birefringent. It occurs as a mineral has 3 different indices of refraction. When the light passes through the Kanoite medium, the light splits due to unequal reflection from the crystal faces. As kanoite is birefringent, it is also anisotropic. In an anisotropic mineral, the velocity of light differs as the direction of the crystal changes.

Discovery and occurrence
Kanoite is a rare mineral which was found in Tatehira mine, Kumaishi, Oshima Peninsula, Hokkaido, Japan in 1977. In the type locality kanoite occurs along a joint that cuts a pyroxmangite-cummingtonite metamorphic rock in a  manganese ore deposit. The region has undergone contact metamorphism as magma intruded the area.  It was named to honor Hiroshi Kano, a petrology professor at Akita University in Japan.

It has also been reported from Broken Hill, New South Wales, Australia, the Semail Ophiolite in Oman, and the Balmat–Edwards zinc district, Saint Lawrence County, New York.

References

Gnos, E., Armbruster, T., and Nyfeler, D. (1996) Kanoite, donpeacorite and tirodite: Mn-Mg-silicates from a manganiferous quartzite in the United Arab Emirates. European Journal of Mineralogy, 8, 251-261.
Kobayashi, H. (1977) Kanoite, (Mn2+;Mg)2[Si2O6], a new clinopyroxene in the metamorphic rock from Tatehira, Oshima Peninsula, Hokkaido, Japan. The Journal of the Geological Society of Japan, 83, 537-542.
Arlt, T. and Armbruster, T. (1997) The temperature dependent P21/c-C2/c phase transition in the clinopyroxene kanoite MnMg[Si2O6]: a single-crystal X-ray and optical study. European Journal of Mineralogy, 9, 953–964.
Akimoto, S. and Syono, Y. (1972) High pressure transformations in MnSiO3. American Mineralogist, 57, 76–84.
Mineral Data Publishing, 2001, “Kanoite.” http://rruff.geo.arizona.edu/doclib/hom/kanoite.pdf. Accessed 21 October 2010.
Ralph, Jolyon and Chau, Ida, 5 November 2010, “Kanoite.” http://www.mindat.org/min-2154.html. Accessed 1 November 2010.
Barthelmy, David, 1997-2010, “Kanoite Mineral Data.” http://www.webmineral.com/data/Kanoite.shtml. Accessed 7 November 2010.
Weisstein, Eric, 1996-2007, “Birefringence.” http://scienceworld.wolfram.com/physics/Birefringence.html. Accessed 7 November 2010.

Inosilicates
Magnesium minerals
Manganese(II) minerals
Monoclinic minerals
Minerals in space group 14
Pyroxene group